Ringgold Place is a set of 26 historic rowhouses located in the Rittenhouse Square West neighborhood of Philadelphia, Pennsylvania. They were built about 1862, and their scale reflects the material shortages during the American Civil War.  The three-story brick residences measure 14 feet by 20 feet, with spartan facades and interiors, over a raised basement. The properties were acquired in 1925, by noted Philadelphia architect George Howe (1886–1955). His office was located at 1900 Ringgold Place and he owned the houses until 1934. He or Tilden, Register & Pepper, a firm he employed, modernized the dwellings and introduced some decorative elements to the 19th Street facades.

The houses were added to the National Register of Historic Places in 1983.

References

Houses on the National Register of Historic Places in Philadelphia
Houses completed in 1862
Rittenhouse Square, Philadelphia
1862 establishments in Pennsylvania